FGIN-1-43 is an anxiolytic drug which acts as a selective agonist at the peripheral benzodiazepine receptor, also known as the mitochondrial 18 kDa translocator protein or TSPO. It is thought to produce anxiolytic effects by stimulating steroidogenesis of neuroactive steroids such as allopregnanolone, and is several times more potent than the related drug FGIN-127.

References 

Tryptamines
Anxiolytics
TSPO ligands
Chloroarenes